Information, Communication & Society is a peer-reviewed academic journal covering the role of digital media in the Information Age. It was established in 1998 and is published by Routledge. The editor-in-chief is Brian Loader (University of York). According to the Journal Citation Reports, the journal has a 2018 impact factor of 4.124, ranking it 4th out of 88 journals in the category "Communication" and 5th out of 148 journals in the category "Sociology".

References

External links

Routledge academic journals
Information science journals
Media studies journals
Publications established in 1998
English-language journals
Journals published between 13 and 25 times per year